Vladimir Tenev (born 13 February 1987) is a Bulgarian-American entrepreneur who is the co-founder (with Baiju Bhatt) and CEO of Robinhood, a US-based financial technology services company.

Early life
Tenev was born in Bulgaria, and his parents migrated to the U.S. when he was five. His parents both worked for the World Bank.  He attended Thomas Jefferson High School for Science and Technology in Fairfax County, Virginia.

He earned a degree in mathematics from Stanford University, where he met Baiju Bhatt. He studied for a mathematics PhD at UCLA, but dropped out to work with Bhatt.

Career
In 2010, Tenev and Bhatt started a high-frequency trading software company called Celeris.  By January 2011 they abandoned it to create Chronos Research, which sold low-latency software to other trading firms and banks.

In 2013, Tenev and Bhatt co-founded the trading platform Robinhood. In 2015, Robinhood launched its mobile app to the public. Following a funding round in May 2018 which increased Robinhood's valuation to $6 billion, Tenev and Bhatt became billionaires.

In November 2020, Tenev became the sole CEO of Robinhood, having previously shared the co-CEO title with Bhatt.

In July 2021, Robinhood went public at a $32 billion valuation.

GameStop short squeeze 
Tenev defended Robinhood's decision to prevent users from buying stock or options in a variety of securities, notably GameStop, during the GameStop short squeeze; the decision had sparked widespread criticism from users of the app as well as politicians in both major American parties.

On January 28, 2021, Robinhood was among a number of brokerages that halted users from buying stock or options in GameStop and the other heavily shorted-securities.

On February 18, 2021, Tenev testified before the United States House Committee on Financial Services regarding Robinhood's role during the GameStop short squeeze. Tenev came under criticism from members of both parties and was criticized for struggling to provide answers to a number of questions.

His testimony explained that Robinhood’s decision to halt securities was driven by a need to meet federal clearinghouse deposit requirements, and refuted a number of theories that accused Robinhood of colluding with hedge funds during the squeeze.

In its July 1, 2021 S-1 filing with the SEC, Robinhood disclosed that the US Attorney's Office had executed a search warrant for Tenev's cell phone as part of a probe into the GameStop short squeeze.

Awards

Other awards
He was invited to be the keynote speaker at UCLA's 2019 Math Commencement Ceremony.

Personal life 
Tenev is married to Celina A. Tenev, notably a Co-Founder of an emergency health service, Call9. The pair have one daughter.

References

External links
 

Living people
American company founders
American billionaires
Stanford University alumni
Robinhood (company)
Bulgarian emigrants to the United States
People from Varna, Bulgaria
Bulgarian billionaires
Thomas Jefferson High School for Science and Technology alumni
Former billionaires
1987 births